Giuseppe Abbagnale (born 24 July 1959 in Pompei) is the current President of the Italian Rowing Federation and former Italian rower who won multiple coxed pair world and Olympic championships with his brother Carmine Abbagnale.

The Abbagnale brothers are the older brothers of the three-time Olympic champion Agostino.

Biography
He received a gold medal in coxed pair with Giuseppe Di Capua (cox) and his younger brother Carmine, at the 1984 Summer Olympics in Los Angeles, and again at the 1988 Summer Olympics in Seoul. The crew won silver medals at  the 1992 Summer Olympics in Barcelona behind another pair of brothers, Greg and Jonny Searle.

See also
 Italy national rowing team

References

External links

1959 births
Living people
Italian male rowers
Olympic rowers of Italy
Olympic gold medalists for Italy
Rowers at the 1980 Summer Olympics
Rowers at the 1984 Summer Olympics
Rowers at the 1988 Summer Olympics
Rowers at the 1992 Summer Olympics
Olympic medalists in rowing
World Rowing Championships medalists for Italy
Medalists at the 1992 Summer Olympics
Medalists at the 1988 Summer Olympics
Medalists at the 1984 Summer Olympics
Olympic silver medalists for Italy
Thomas Keller Medal recipients
People from Pompei
Competitors at the 1979 Mediterranean Games
Competitors at the 1991 Mediterranean Games
Competitors at the 1993 Mediterranean Games
Mediterranean Games gold medalists for Italy
Mediterranean Games silver medalists for Italy
Mediterranean Games medalists in rowing
Sportspeople from the Province of Naples